Temple Park is a suburb of Bracknell in the English county of Berkshire and part of the civil parish of Binfield. It was built during the 1990s as the town continued to expand on open countryside between Bracknell and Binfield.

Temple Park is built around Park Farm in Wood Lane, the Home Farm of the old Binfield Manor estate. The Blue Mountain Golf Club was located to the west of the estate .

References

External links

Bracknell
Suburbs in the United Kingdom